Marcus Mamoru Toji is an American actor and voice actor best known for his role on Movie Surfers and Little Giants.  Born in California in 1984, Toji attended Beverly Hills High School, was in a Betty Crocker Commercial for fruit snacks and won a Copper Wing Award in 2006 for his role in movie Self Medicated.

Filmography

Television 
Maniac (2018)
 Patriot (2017)
 Hanazuki: Full of Treasures (2017)
 We Bare Bears (2017–2019)
 Workaholics (2015)
 Rainbow Brite (2014)
 The Goldbergs (2014)
 The Legend of Korra (2013–14)
General Hospital (2013)
 Happy Endings (2012)
 Rules of Engagement (2010)
 Party Down (2010)
 House (2009)
 Zoey 101 (2007–08)
 It's Always Sunny in Philadelphia (2007)
 Weeds (2006)
 Movie Surfers (1998–2003)
 Party of Five (1994–99)
 7th Heaven (1998)
 Boy Meets World (1994–97)
 Partners (1994–96)
 Thunder Alley (1994–95)
 Drexell's Class (1991–92)

Movies 
 Words Bubble Up Like Soda Pop (2021)
 Self Medicated (2005)
 Right on Track  (2003)
 Max Keeble's Big Move (2001)
 The Little Mermaid II: Return to the Sea (2000)
 Toothless (1997)
 Dear God (1996)
 Jingle All the Way (1996)
 Corrina, Corrina (1994)
 Little Giants (1994)

References

External links 

20th-century American male actors
21st-century American male actors
American male child actors
American male voice actors
Living people
1984 births
American male actors of Japanese descent